The 1948 Boston Red Sox season was the 48th season in the franchise's Major League Baseball history. After 154 regular-season games, the Red Sox and Cleveland Indians finished atop the American League with identical records of 96 wins and 58 losses. The teams then played a tie-breaker game, which was won by Cleveland, 8–3. Thus, the Red Sox finished their season with a record of 96 wins and 59 losses, one game behind Cleveland.

This was the first Red Sox season to be broadcast on television, with broadcasts alternated between WBZ-TV and WNAC-TV, with the same broadcast team regardless of broadcasting station.

Offseason 
In December 1947, the Red Sox made a deal with the St. Louis Browns. The Sox acquired Vern Stephens, Billy Hitchcock, and pitchers Jack Kramer and Ellis Kinder. The deal cost $375,000 and 11 Red Sox players.

Notable transactions 
 Prior to 1948 season (exact date unknown)
Milt Bolling was signed as an amateur free agent by the Red Sox.
Bob Smith was signed as an amateur free agent by the Red Sox.

Regular season 
In 1948, Kramer led the American League in winning percentage. The manager of the team was former New York Yankees manager Joe McCarthy, who replaced the outgoing Joe Cronin. Cronin had led the Red Sox to an 83–71 record in 1947, finishing in third place.

Throughout 1948, the Sox, New York Yankees, and the Cleveland Indians slugged it out for the pennant. At the end of the regular season, Boston and Cleveland were tied for first place. Each team had a record of 96 wins and 58 losses, two games ahead of the Yankees.

American League Playoff 
At the end of the season, the Red Sox and the Indians were tied for first place. This led to the American League's first-ever one-game playoff. The game was played at Fenway Park on Monday, October 4, 1948. The start time was 1:15 pm EST.

McCarthy picked former St. Louis Browns pitcher Denny Galehouse, who had an 8–7 pitching record, to be his starter. The Indians won the game by the score of 8–3. Indians third baseman Ken Keltner contributed to the victory with his single, double, and 3-run homer over the Green Monster in the 4th inning. Later, McCarthy said he had no rested arms and that there was no else who could pitch. Mel Parnell and Ellis Kinder claimed that they were both ready to pitch.

Season standings

Record vs. opponents

Opening Day lineup

Roster

Player stats

Batting

Starters by position 
Note: Pos = Position; G = Games played; AB = At bats; H = Hits; Avg. = Batting average; HR = Home runs; RBI = Runs batted in

Other batters 
Note: G = Games played; AB = At bats; H = Hits; Avg. = Batting average; HR = Home runs; RBI = Runs batted in

Pitching

Starting pitchers 
Note: G = Games pitched; IP = Innings pitched; W = Wins; L = Losses; ERA = Earned run average; SO = Strikeouts

Other pitchers 
Note: G = Games pitched; IP = Innings pitched; W = Wins; L = Losses; ERA = Earned run average; SO = Strikeouts

Relief pitchers 
Note: G = Games pitched; W = Wins; L = Losses; SV = Saves; ERA = Earned run average; SO = Strikeouts

Farm system 

LEAGUE CHAMPIONS: Birmingham, Scranton, Oneonta, Milford

Source:

References

External links
1948 Boston Red Sox team page at Baseball Reference
1948 Boston Red Sox season at baseball-almanac.com

Boston Red Sox seasons
Boston Red Sox
Boston Red Sox
1940s in Boston